The men's canoe sprint K-1 200 metres competition at the 2012 Olympic Games in London took place between 10 and 11 August at Eton Dorney.

Great Britain's Ed McKeever won the gold medal, ahead of Saúl Craviotto from Spain who won silver. Mark de Jonge from Canada took bronze.

Competition format

The competition comprised heats, semifinals, and a final round.  The top five boats from each heat, and the fastest loser, advanced to the semifinals.  The top four boats in each semifinal advanced to the "A" final, and competed for medals.  A placing "B" final was held for the other semifinalists.

Schedule

All times are British Summer Time (UTC+01:00)

Results

Heats
The five best placed boats in each heat and the fastest sixth placed both qualify for the semifinals.

Heat 1

Heat 2

Heat 3

Semifinals
The fastest four canoeists in each semifinal qualify for the 'A' final. The slowest four canoeists in each semifinal qualify for the 'B' final.

Semifinal 1

Semifinal 2

Finals

Final B

Final A

References

Canoeing at the 2012 Summer Olympics
Men's events at the 2012 Summer Olympics